NLN may refer to:
National Lampoon Inc (stock symbol NLN)
National League for Nursing
National League of the North
National Learning Network, a large UK repository of online learning materials
 Neurolysin, a human protein found in the mitochondria
New London Northern Railroad